HMS Rye (J76) was a  built for the Royal Navy during the Second World War.

Design and description
The Bangor class was designed as a small minesweeper that could be easily built in large numbers by civilian shipyards; as steam turbines were difficult to manufacture, the ships were designed to accept a wide variety of engines. The ship's complement consisted of 60 officers and ratings.

She was powered by two Parsons geared steam turbines, each driving one shaft, using steam provided by two Admiralty three-drum boilers.

The turbine-powered Bangors were armed with a 12-pounder  anti-aircraft gun and a single QF 2-pounder (4 cm) AA gun. In some ships the 2-pounder was replaced a single or twin  20 mm Oerlikon AA gun, while most ships were fitted with four additional single Oerlikon mounts over the course of the war. For escort work, her minesweeping gear could be exchanged for around 40 depth charges.

Construction and career
Rye was built by the Ailsa Shipbuilding Co. Ltd. in Troon, Scotland and commissioned in 1941. Her pennant number was J 76. Rye served in the Mediterranean Sea based in Malta as part of the 14th/17th Minesweeper Flotilla. She took part in the Malta Convoys, notably Operation Harpoon during which she rescued 84 survivors from the SS Chant, and in Operation Pedestal during which she was one of the ships that rescued the SS Ohio. The Ryes captain, Iain Pearson, was awarded a bar to his DSC for service during the Malta Convoys.

After the Mediterranean, Rye returned to Home waters and served with the 14th M/S Flotilla based in Plymouth. She was part of Operation Neptune, the naval component of Operation Overlord (D-Day). The flotilla participated in minesweeping operations from 5–30 June, initially clearing paths through the German minefields to the invasion beaches, and subsequently clearing wider areas to allow transport and supply vessels to operate in safety.

Postwar 
Rye was decommissioned on 24 August 1948. She was scrapped at Purfleet in Essex in September 1948. Her ensign is laid up in St Mary's parish church in the town of Rye, East Sussex.

The Rye and District Sea Cadets maintain the traditions of HMS Rye.

References

Bibliography

External links 
 HMS Rye (J 76) - uboat.net
 Minesweeping at Malta
 Rye & District Sea Cadets, HMS Rye
 Operation Harpoon, 15 June 1942
 WWII Awards for RN Minesweeping
 HMS Rye record at Clydebuilt Ships Database

Bangor-class minesweepers of the Royal Navy
Ships built on the River Clyde
1940 ships
World War II minesweepers of the United Kingdom